Juniper Canyon is a census-designated place (CDP) in Crook County, Oregon, United States. It was first listed as a CDP prior to the 2020 census.

The CDP is an area of low-density housing in western Crook County, bordered to the northwest by the city of Prineville, the county seat. The CDP is bordered to the west by Oregon Route 27, to the north and east by Oregon Route 380, and to the south by Prineville Reservoir on the Crooked River, a northwest-flowing tributary of the Deschutes River. Juniper Canyon Road crosses the CDP from just outside Prineville in the northwest to its end at Prineville Reservoir State Park in the southeast.

The Juniper Canyon CDP fully encloses the CDP of Prineville Lake Acres.

Demographics

References 

Census-designated places in Crook County, Oregon
Census-designated places in Oregon